Giyosjon Boboev (born 12 May 1993) is an Uzbek judoka.

He is the gold medallist of the 2017 Judo Grand Prix Tbilisi in the -73 kg category.

References

External links

 
 

1993 births
Living people
Judoka at the 2018 Asian Games
Asian Games competitors for Uzbekistan
21st-century Uzbekistani people